Stavanger/Sandnes is the third largest urban area in Norway. It consists of the densely built-up areas in the municipalities of Stavanger, Sandnes, Sola, and Randaberg, most of which are located on the Stavanger Peninsula, its surrounding islands, and the mainland south of the peninsula. Stavanger/Sandnes is the central part of the Stavanger Region.

On 1 January 2021, the  urban area had a population of 229,911. The area has had a big growth in population, and is one of the fastest growing urban areas in Norway. It is expected that larger portions of Sola municipality will grow together with the urban area in the future.

Population

References

Stavanger
Sandnes